Augusta is a genus of flowering plants in the family Rubiaceae. It is found in tropical Latin America from Mexico to Brazil and also in the southwestern Pacific (Fiji and New Caledonia).

Species 
 Augusta austrocaledonica (Brongn.) J.H.Kirkbr. - New Caledonia
 Augusta longifolia (Spreng.) Rehder - Brazil
Augusta longifolia var. longifolia
Augusta longifolia var. parvifolia (Pohl) Delprete - Rio de Janeiro
 Augusta rivalis (Benth.) J.H.Kirkbr. - Mexico, Central America, Colombia
 Augusta vitiensis (Seem.) J.H.Kirkbr. - Fiji

References

External links 
 Augusta in the World Checklist of Rubiaceae

Rubiaceae genera
Augusteae
Flora of Central America